The siege of Jülich of 1610 took place from 28 July to 2 September 1610, during the opening stages of the War of the Jülich Succession. After an Imperial force occupied the city of Jülich, a Dutch, Palatine, and Brandenburg army besieged the city, compelling the Imperials to surrender and withdraw.

Duchy of Jülich